The Marching Season is a 1999 spy fiction novel by Daniel Silva.

It is the sequel to The Mark of the Assassin by the same author.

Plot summary
Former Agent Michael Osbourne is rerecruited by the CIA when his father-in-law Douglas Cannon, the new ambassador to the Court of St. James, is sent to the United Kingdom to promote the peace process between Protestants and Catholics of Northern Ireland, which has been jeopardized by three bloody attempts to derail them. Michael must once again face the elusive and lethal KGB-trained assassin October, with whom he has unfinished business.

International titles
Portuguese: A Marcha. (The March). (2011).

References

1998 American novels
American spy novels
Novels by Daniel Silva
Novels set in Northern Ireland
Sequel novels